Rachid Arma (born 16 January 1985) is a Moroccan footballer who plays as a forward for Italian Serie D club Chievo-Sona.

Club career
Rachid Arma was born in Agadir. In 1989, his father left Morocco to move to San Bonifacio, Italy, for work purposes, and the rest of the family, including Rachid, joined him later in 1995.

In 2004, he was promoted into Sambonifacese's first team, and played four consecutive Serie D seasons with the Verona club, being instrumental in their promotion to Lega Pro Seconda Divisione during the 2007–08 season thanks to his 21 goals.

SPAL
He was consequently noted by a number of professional clubs, and was acquired by Lega Pro Prima Divisione outfit SPAL during the 2008 summer transfer window. With SPAL, he immediately managed to achieve some space under the guidance of head coach Aldo Dolcetti, and provided a 13-goal tally in his first professional season. He then achieved national coverage after he managed to score two goals to Serie A side Palermo in the third round of the Coppa Italia 2009–10; the match ended with a 4–2 win for the Sicilians, but Arma was subsequently noted by Serie B giants Torino and was acquired by the granata in co-ownership deal only days after his impressive performance in the Coppa Italia, which also proved to be his final game with SPAL.

In June 2010, SPAL bought back Arma from Torino. In July 2010, he was acquired by Serie B club Cittadella in a co-ownership bid, with Francesco Battaglia moved to opposite direction . On 31 August 2010, Vicenza Calcio acquired the co-ownership from Cittadella, for a peppercorn fee of €500. He returned to SPAL for a second spell in July 2011 in temporary deal. In June 2012 SPAL bought back Arma for €84,115.

Carpi
After SPAL went bankrupted, Arma left for Carpi F.C. 1909.

Pisa
On 2 August 2013 Arma was signed by A.C. Pisa 1909, in Lega Pro Prima Divisione.

Reggiana
On 24 July 2015 Arma left Pisa and moved to A.C. Reggiana 1919.
In reggiana he became the best striker of the team.

Pordenone 
On 30 June 2016, he joined Pordenone. But at the end of the season, he decides to terminate his contract to join Triestina.

L.R. Vicenza Virtus
On 18 August 2018 Arma joined Serie C club L.R. Vicenza Virtus, a phoenix club of Vicenza Calcio.

Later years
On 11 September 2020 he joined Virtus Verona on a 2-year contract.

After two seasons with Virtus Verona, in September 2022 he signed for Serie D amateurs Chievo-Sona.

References

External links
 AIC profile (data by football.it) 

1985 births
Living people
People from Agadir
Moroccan footballers
Association football forwards
Serie B players
Serie C players
A.C. Sambonifacese players
S.P.A.L. players
Torino F.C. players
L.R. Vicenza players
A.C. Carpi players
Pisa S.C. players
A.C. Reggiana 1919 players
Pordenone Calcio players
U.S. Triestina Calcio 1918 players
Virtus Verona players
Moroccan expatriate footballers
Moroccan expatriate sportspeople in Italy
Expatriate footballers in Italy